Chillicothe Township is located in Peoria County, Illinois, United States. As of the 2010 census, its population was 8,364 and it contained 3,694 housing units.

Geography

Demographics

References

External links
 US Census
 Illinois State Archives

Townships in Peoria County, Illinois
Peoria metropolitan area, Illinois
Townships in Illinois
1849 establishments in Illinois
populated places established in 1849